Badabum Cha Cha is an Italian song by Sicilian rapper Marracash. Released on April 18, 2008, the song is the album and rapper's lead single. The song was first released on Marracash's official website and just in two days, the song had been listened 5.000 times. Due to high Italian airplay, and also due to high sales, the song from #31, reached a peak of #25.

Music video
The video of the song was shot in Barona, Milan, in March 2008. First the music video was released on official rapper's MySpace and subsequently released to MTV from April 21. In the video also appears J Ax. A parody video, called "Badabum Qua Qua", was released on YouTube

Chart performance
The song has been listed for 18 weeks on the Italy Singles Top 50. It entered the chart on position 28 on week 20/2008, its last appearance was on week 37/2008. It peaked on number 25, where it stayed for 1 week.

References

2008 singles
Italian hip hop songs
2008 songs
Universal Music Group singles